FC Istra is an association football club from Istra, Russia, founded in 1997. It played in the Russian Second Division from 2008 to 2012, at which point it lost the financing and dropped back to the amateur levels. The most successful moment of the club is 2011-12 Russian Cup. Istra reached Round of 32, in which they lost to Russian Premier League giants Spartak Moscow 0–1.

External links
Official website

Association football clubs established in 1997
Football clubs in Russia
Football in Moscow Oblast
1997 establishments in Russia